Gustav Havel (27 August 1930 - 30 December 1967) was a Grand Prix motorcycle road racer from the former Czechoslovakia. Havel began his Grand Prix career in 1961 with Jawa. He enjoyed his best season in 1961 when he finished the season in third place in the 350cc world championship behind Gary Hocking and his Jawa teammate, František Šťastný.

He died during a motorcycle crash in 1967.

Motorcycle Grand Prix results 
Points system from 1950 to 1968:

(key) (Races in italics indicate fastest lap)

References 

1930 births
Czech motorcycle racers
Czechoslovak motorcycle racers
350cc World Championship riders
1967 deaths